Tiger Creek may refer to:

Tiger Creek (Florida), a stream in Polk County
Tiger Creek (Georgia), a stream in Catoosa and Whitfield counties